The 2017 Dalian Transcendence F.C. season is the 4th season in club history.

Background
After struggling in the relegation zone last season, many valuable players decided to leave. Goal keeper Guo Wei announced on his social media that the team defaulted his salary, and he gained a chance to end his contract through a CFA arbitration. They renewed their contract with their caretaker, Rusmir Cviko.

Jaílton Paraíba, the best scorer last season, had been absent since May. It was believed that he flew to the United States to take care of his wife, who recently gave birth to a child. However, Paraíba released a video clip later, accusing the team for providing poor accommodation, as well as defaulting his salary for more than 3 months, that he will seek to end the contract.

On 10 August, it's been reported that Rusmir resigned due to family concern, and the team decided to promote their reserve team manager, Li Guoxu.

Dalian Transcendence struggled throughout the 2017 season to prevent from relegation. The position was fixed until the last round, as Transcendence shared same points with Baoding Yingli ETS, but won a head-to-head match.

Kits

Preseason

Training matches

China League One

League table

Results summary

Position by round

League fixtures and results
. Some fixtures might be adjusted if necessary.

Chinese FA Cup

FA Cup fixtures and results

Player information

Transfers

In

Out

Squad

Reserve squad

Coaching staff 
As of season 2017

League performance data 
As of 28 October.

References

Dalian Transcendence F.C.
Dalian Transcendence F.C. seasons